This is a list of notable British people with Lebanese ancestry or Lebanese people who have dual Lebanese and British nationality who live or lived in the United Kingdom.

Actors

 Samia Smith - actress
 Sean Yazbeck - winner of the fifth season (2006) of Donald Trump's reality show, The Apprentice

Athletes
 Jed Chouman - footballer
 Hady Ghandour - footballer
 Majed Osman - footballer

Businessmen
 Assaad Razzouk - CEO of Gurīn, clean-energy entrepreneur, author, podcaster, commentator, married to British-Lebanese journalist Roula Khalaf
 Marlon Abela - columnist, businessman, restaurateur, and the founder and chairman of the Marlon Abela Restaurant Corporation (MARC), a privately owned international hospitality company based in Mayfair, London.
 Samir Assaf - CEO of HSBC investment 
 Samir Brikho - businessman
 Ely Calil - businessman
 Sam Hammam - owner of Cardiff City F.C.

Entertainment
 Alex Garland - writer, filmmaker, director and grandson of Peter Medawar 
 Dom Joly -  comedian, columnist and broadcaster

Law
 Amal Clooney (née Alamuddin) - lawyer

Military
 Gabriel Coury - recipient of the Victoria Cross, the highest and most prestigious award for gallantry in the face of the enemy that can be awarded to British and Commonwealth forces.

Musicians
 Al Bowlly - Dance Band singer  
 Mika - musician and songwriter
 Sarbel - Lebanese-British-Cypriot singer

Scientists
 Michael Atiyah - British-Lebanese mathematician
Peter Medawar - British scientist of Lebanese origin, 1960 Nobel Prize winner for work on graft rejection and the discovery of acquired immune tolerance
Caleb Saleeby - British-Lebanese physician, writer, and journalist known for his support of eugenics. During World War I, he was an adviser to the Minister of Food and advocated the establishment of a Ministry of Health.

Writers
 Roula Khalaf - editor of the Financial Times and married to Assaad Razzouk
 Nasri Atallah - author, publisher, media analyst
 Nader El-Bizri - philosopher, architectural theorist
 Michael Karam - journalist, author, wine writer
 Naeem Murr - novelist and short story writer

See also
Lebanese people in the United Kingdom
List of Lebanese people
Lists of Lebanese diaspora

References

UK
List
Lists of British people by origin
Lebanese